Tubular Bells is the debut studio album by the British musician Mike Oldfield, released on 25 May 1973 as the first album on Virgin Records. It comprises two mostly instrumental tracks. Oldfield, who was 19 years old when it was recorded, played almost all the instruments.

Tubular Bells initially sold slowly, but gained worldwide attention in December 1973 when its opening theme was used for the soundtrack to the horror film The Exorcist. This led to a surge in sales which increased Oldfield's profile and played an important part in the growth of the Virgin Group. It stayed in the top ten of the UK Albums Chart for one year from March 1974, during which it reached number one for one week. It reached number three on the US Billboard 200, and number one in Canada and Australia. It has sold more than 2.7 million copies in the UK and an estimated 15 million copies worldwide.

An orchestral version produced by David Bedford was released in 1975 as The Orchestral Tubular Bells. It was followed by the albums Tubular Bells II (1992), Tubular Bells III (1998), The Millennium Bell (1999), and a re-recorded version, Tubular Bells 2003, for its 30th anniversary. A remastered edition was released in 2009. Its contribution to British music was recognised when Oldfield played extracts during the 2012 Summer Olympics opening ceremony in London. In 2010, Tubular Bells was one of ten classic album covers from British artists commemorated on a series of UK postage stamps issued by the Royal Mail.

Background 
Oldfield learned to play the guitar at an early age, and as a teenager he became the bass player for the Whole World, a band put together by former Soft Machine member Kevin Ayers. The Whole World recorded their album Shooting at the Moon (1970) at Abbey Road Studios over several months in 1970, when Oldfield was 17. When the group did not have a recording session booked in the morning, Oldfield would arrive early and experiment with the different instruments, including pianos, harpischords, a Mellotron and various orchestral percussion instruments, and learned to play each of them.

The Whole World broke up in mid-1971 and Ayers lent Oldfield a two-track Bang & Olufsen Beocord " tape recorder. Oldfield blocked off the erase head of the tape machine, which allowed him to record onto one track, bounce the recording onto the second, and record a new instrument onto the first track, thus overdubbing his playing one instrument at a time, and effectively making multitrack recordings. 

In his flat in Tottenham in north London, Oldfield recorded demos of four tracks he had been composing in his head for some years, using the tape recorder, his guitar and bass, some toy percussion instruments, and a Farfisa organ borrowed from the Whole World keyboardist David Bedford. The demos comprised three shorter melodies (early versions of what would become the sections "Peace", "Bagpipe Guitars", and "Caveman" on Tubular Bells 2003), and a longer piece he had provisionally titled "Opus One". Oldfield was inspired to write a long instrumental after hearing Septober Energy (1971), the only album by Centipede. He was also influenced by classical music, and by A Rainbow in Curved Air (1969) by the experimental composer Terry Riley, on which Riley played all the instruments himself and used tape loops and overdubs to build up a long, repetitive piece of music.

Late in 1971, Oldfield joined the band of Arthur Louis, who were recording demos at the Manor Studio. The studio was being constructed in the former squash court of an old manor house in Shipton-on-Cherwell, Oxfordshire, which had recently been bought by the young entrepreneur Richard Branson and which was being turned into a residential recording facility run by his music production team of Tom Newman and Simon Heyworth. Oldfield was shy and socially awkward, but struck up a friendship with the producers after they heard his guitar playing. Oldfield asked Newman to listen to his demos, but they were in his Tottenham flat, so one of Louis' roadies drove Oldfield to London and back to retrieve them. Newman and Heyworth made a copy of the demos onto 4-track tape, and promised Oldfield that they would speak to Branson and his business partner Simon Draper about them. After the album was released, Newman said he preferred the demo versions: "They were complete melodies in themselves – with intros and fade-outs or ends. I liked them very much and was a little nonplussed when Mike strung them all together."

Oldfield spent much of 1972 working with his old bandmates from the Whole World on their solo projects while trying to find a record label interested in his demos. Oldfield approached labels including EMI and CBS, but each rejected him, believing the piece was unmarketable without vocals. Increasingly frustrated and short of money, Oldfield heard that the Soviet Union paid musicians to give public performances, and was at the point of looking through the telephone directory for the phone number of the Soviet embassy when Draper called him with an invitation to dinner with Branson on Branson's houseboat moored in London. Branson told Oldfield that he liked the demos, and wanted Oldfield to spend a week at the Manor recording "Opus One".

Recording 
Tubular Bells was recorded on an Ampex 2-inch 16-track tape recorder with the Dolby noise-reduction system, which was the Manor's main recording equipment at the time. Oldfield had Virgin hire instruments including guitars, keyboards and percussion instruments. Oldfield has recounted differing stories over the years regarding the inclusion of the tubular bells; in 2001 he suggested that they were among the instruments he asked Branson to hire, but in 2013, he said that he saw them among the instruments being removed from the studios after John Cale had finished recording there, and asked for them to be left behind. 

Oldfield, Newman, and Heyworth spent their evenings drinking in a pub, after which they returned to the Manor and recorded through the night. Heyworth recalled several disasters, including one instance where half a day's work was accidentally erased. Final mixing was an involved process, with the faders operated by Oldfield, Newman, Heyworth, and two others simultaneously. They followed detailed tracking charts and the process was restarted if one person made even a slight mistake. Heyworth recalled difficulty in cutting the album due to vinyl's limited dynamic range, and insisted on heavy vinyl normally used for classical records.

Oldfield played the majority of the instruments as a series of overdubs, which was an uncommon recording technique at the time. In total, 274 overdubs were made and an estimated two thousand "punch-ins", although Newman said "it was really only 70 or 80" in total. Despite various guitars being listed on the album sleeve, such as "speed guitars", "fuzz guitars" and "guitars sounding like bagpipes", the only electric guitar used on the album was a 1966 blonde Fender Telecaster which used to belong to Marc Bolan and to which Oldfield had added an extra Bill Lawrence pickup. The guitars were recorded via direct injection into the mixing desk. To create the "speed guitar" and "mandolin-like guitar" named in the sleeve notes, the tape was recorded at half speed. An actual mandolin was used only for the ending of Part Two. Oldfield also used a custom effects unit, the Glorfindel box, to create the "fuzz guitars" and "bagpipe guitars" distortion. In 2011, Oldfield's Telecaster was sold for £6,500, and the money was donated to the mental health charity SANE. According to the engineer Phil Newell, the bass guitar used on the album was one of his Fender Telecaster Basses.

Side one 
Oldfield recorded side one, known as "Opus One" at the time, during his one allotted week at the Manor in November 1972. He was particularly interested in starting the piece with a repeating riff, and devised the opening piano sequence after experimenting with an idea for several minutes on Bedford's Farfisa organ. He wanted a slight variation on its 16/8 time signature by dropping the sixteenth beat, and chose the key of A minor as it was easy to play. Oldfield recorded the opening riff on a Steinway grand piano, but struggled to perform in time. Heyworth solved the problem by placing a microphone next to a metronome in another room and feeding it into Oldfield's headphones. The short honky-tonk piano section was included as a tribute to Oldfield's grandmother, who had played the instrument in pubs before World War II. The staff and workers at the Manor made up the "nasal choir" that accompanies it. Oldfield had difficulty in producing a sound from the tubular bells, as he wanted a loud note from them but both the standard leather-covered and bare metal hammers did not produce the volume that he wanted. In the end, Newman obtained a heavier claw hammer and Oldfield used it to produce the desired sound intensity but cracked the bells in the process.

The track closes with a segment featuring Vivian Stanshall, formerly of the comedic rock group Bonzo Dog Doo-Dah Band, introducing each instrument being played one by one. The idea originated when the band were due to use the Manor after Oldfield, and had arrived while he was still recording. Oldfield had liked the way Stanshall introduced the instruments one at a time on the Bonzos' song "The Intro and the Outro" on Gorilla (1967), and told Newman that he would like Stanshall to do the same. Newman agreed, but had to persuade the shy Oldfield to ask Stanshall if he would carry out the request. Stanshall readily agreed to the idea and is credited on the liner notes as "Master of Ceremonies", but Newman recalled that the job proved to be more difficult than anticipated, as Stanshall forgot the names of the instruments and introduced them at the wrong points. Oldfield wrote a list of the instruments in order, indicating where Stanshall should introduce them. The way in which Stanshall said "plus... tubular bells" inspired Oldfield to use it as the album's title.

Side two 
After Part One had been recorded, Oldfield was allowed to stay on at the Manor to record additional overdubs during studio downtime. He spent Christmas and New Year at his family's home, but returned to the Manor from February to April 1973 to record the second part of his planned album. Oldfield had "Part Two" mapped out and sequenced by the time he came to record it.

The "caveman" section is the only part of Tubular Bells that features a drum kit, which is played by Steve Broughton of the Edgar Broughton Band. The section begins with a backing track of bass and drums, with Oldfield overdubbing all other instruments. The shouting vocals developed near the end of the recording, when he had practically finished recording the instruments for the section but felt it needed something else. Heyworth recalled that Branson was getting impatient and pressured Oldfield to deliver the album, and to include vocals on one of the tracks so he could release it as a single. Angered by Branson's suggestion, Oldfield returned to the Manor where he drank half a bottle of Jameson's whiskey from the studio's cellar and demanded that the engineer take him to the studio where, intoxicated, he "screamed his brains out for 10 minutes" into a microphone. The incident left Oldfield so hoarse that he was unable to speak for two weeks. The engineer ran the tape at a higher speed during the recording, so that upon playback the tape ran at normal speed, thus dropping the pitch of the voice track and producing the "Piltdown Man" vocals listed on the credits.

Side two closes with a rendition of "The Sailor's Hornpipe", a track Oldfield had been performing since he was in the Whole World. It was originally preceded by a longer version of the piece, featuring a vocal contribution from Stanshall over musical backing and marching footsteps. This session occurred at 4 a.m. after Oldfield, Stanshall, and Newman had spent the night drinking. Newman placed microphones in various rooms of the Manor and began recording, and the trio set off on an unplanned tour of the house, with Oldfield on mandolin and Newman on acoustic guitar playing "The Sailor's Hornpipe" while Stanshall gave an inebriated, improvised tour of the Manor. In the end, a more traditional instrumental version of the tune was put on the album although Stanshall's version was included on the Boxed compilation. It is also found on the 2001 and 2009 remasters as a bonus track.

Artwork 

The cover of Tubular Bells was created by designer and photographer Trevor Key, who was suggested by Sue Steward, a press officer at Virgin Records at the time. Key was invited to present his portfolio, and one of his designs depicted a boiled egg with blood dripping from it, which Branson liked and wanted to use for the cover because he wanted to call the album Breakfast in Bed. Oldfield hated both the image and the title and rejected them. A modified version of the image, with the blood replaced by egg yolk, was used as the cover for Heaven's Open (1991), Oldfield's final album for Virgin.

Steward accompanied Key to a beach on the Sussex coast to photograph the cover's backdrop. Key brought with him bones shown burning on the beach on the back cover, but the day was bitterly cold and it took some time to set light to them. The perfectionist Key also spent several hours photographing the seascape until he had a shot of the waves that he was happy with. The triangular "bent bell" on the front was inspired by the damage Oldfield had caused to the tubular bells while playing them on the record. Key designed and constructed one, which he then photographed in his studio and superimposed on the beach backdrop. Oldfield was captivated by the finished artwork, and insisted that his name and the album title be in small letters and coloured pale orange, so as not to distract from the overall image. According to Steward, Key was paid £100 for his work, but he went on to design several other sleeves for Virgin and Factory Records artists, including Technique (1989) by New Order and "Genetic Engineering" (1983) by Orchestral Manoeuvres in the Dark.

The "bent bell" has become the image most associated with Oldfield, appearing on the cover of every Tubular Bells sequel album. It is also the logo of his personal music company, Oldfield Music Ltd. The cover of Tubular Bells was among ten images chosen by Royal Mail for a set of "Classic Album Cover" postage stamps, issued in January 2010.

Release 
In January 1973, Branson visited the MIDEM music conference in Cannes, France and pitched side one to various music companies with the hope of securing a record deal. One American executive offered $20,000 if vocals were added to the music. The unsuccessful visit led Branson and Draper to consider putting the album out through mail order, before they chose to form their own label, Virgin Records, and use Tubular Bells as their first release. The album was released in the UK on 25 May 1973, and in North America in October 1973.
 
Early sales were slow, and it was not until July 1973 that the album appeared in the UK Albums Chart, reaching an initial peak of number seven. The situation changed following the release of The Exorcist in December 1973, Oldfield later attributing the music's successful use on the soundtrack to its unusual (15/8) opening time signature. From February 1974 to May 1975, Tubular Bells dropped out of the UK top 10 for only four weeks. Sixteen months after its release, it went to number one for the week ending 5October 1974, having spent 10 consecutive weeks in second place behind Band on the Run (1973) by Wings, and Oldfield's second album Hergest Ridge (1974).

In surpassing Hergest Ridge for the number one album, Oldfield became only the second artist in history to replace himself at the top of the UK album chart, after the Beatles in 1963, and again in 1964. The feat was later achieved by Michael Jackson and David Bowie, although on both occasions this followed the death of the artist. Prior to the 2020s, the album had re-entered the charts in every decade since its release, most recently appearing in the week ending 22 March 2018 (its 287th week in total).

On 22 April 2007, British newspaper The Mail on Sunday gave away 2.25 million free copies of Tubular Bells to its readers in a card packet displaying the artwork. The release was organised by EMI, who had bought out Virgin Records, and the newspaper claimed that its promotion increased sales of the album by 30%. Oldfield was unhappy about the deal, as he had not been consulted about it and felt it devalued the work.

Tubular Bells has sold more than 2.63 million copies in the UK, and an estimated 15 million worldwide. As of July 2016, it was the 42nd best-selling album of all time in the UK.

Singles 
The first single released from the album was created by the original US distributor, Atlantic Records. The single was an edit of the first three sections from Part One and was not authorised by Oldfield. The single was released in February 1974 in the United States and Canada only, where it peaked at number seven on the U.S. Billboard Hot 100 chart on 11 May 1974, making Oldfield a one-hit wonder on the US charts. The track also reached number 15 on the Adult Contemporary chart. In Canada, the single was released as "Tubular Bells (Theme from Exorcist)", peaking at number three on the RPM Top Singles chart on 18 May 1974, and was placed at number 103 in the top 200 singles of the year.

"Mike Oldfield's Single (Theme from Tubular Bells)" was the first 7-inch single released by Oldfield in the UK, in June 1974, peaking at number 31. The A-side was a re-recording of Part Two's "bagpipe guitars" section, arranged in a more pastoral version with acoustic guitars and featuring the oboe (played by Lindsay Cooper) as the lead instrument, with "Froggy Went A-Courting" as the B-side.

Reissues

2009 reissue 
In 2008, Oldfield's original 35-year deal with Virgin Records ended and the rights to the album returned to him. After signing to Mercury Records in 2005, Oldfield's albums originally released on Virgin were transferred to Mercury and re-released, starting the following year. Tubular Bells was reissued in June 2009 in a number of formats, including vinyl, 2-CD and DVD, and includes a new stereo mix by Oldfield in March 2009 from his home studio in Nassau, Bahamas. The Deluxe Edition contains a 5.1 surround sound mix and the Ultimate Edition contains an accompanying book and memorabilia.

The release was promoted by a series of bell-ringing events at 6 p.m. on 6 June 2009, a reference to the Number of the Beast. One of the events was held at the British Music Experience at The O2, featuring the 29-piece Handbell Ringers of Great Britain and a performance by The Orb named  "Orbular Bells". There were also bell-ringing workshops and competitions at the Experience. The album reached number 11 in the UK.

Live performances

Queen Elizabeth Hall, 1973 

After recording Tubular Bells, Oldfield felt he had "got it out of his system" and was reluctant to do any promotional engagements. However, Branson and Draper felt a live performance of the work was the best way to present it to journalists and the public, and organised a concert at London's Queen Elizabeth Hall on 25 June 1973. Oldfield was convinced that the music would not come off well in a live setting, and despite several well-known and accomplished musicians agreeing to the one-off show, refused to do it. Desperate to prevent Oldfield pulling out, Branson offered to give Oldfield his Bentley car, which he had bought from George Harrison and knew Oldfield liked, if he went through with the gig. Oldfield agreed, and following rehearsals at Shepperton film studios, Oldfield still had reservations about the performance until Mick Taylor of The Rolling Stones brought frontman Mick Jagger backstage to meet Oldfield, whose support gave Oldfield the confidence to "at least walk on stage." The concert went ahead and was well received, leaving Oldfied "stunned".

The concert featured members of Henry Cow and musicians associated with the Canterbury Scene, as well as Mick Taylor of the Rolling Stones. Steve Winwood and Robert Wyatt were also due to take part, but Winwood pulled out as he was unable to find time to attend the rehearsals, and Wyatt was recovering from the recent accident that had left him paralysed.

Musicians:

Kevin Ayers – bass guitar
David Bedford – grand piano, accordion, organ, choir master, string arrangements
Steve Broughton – drums
Jon Field – flute
Fred Frith – electric guitar, bass guitar
John Greaves – Davoli electric piano, Farfisa organ, tin whistle, Vox organ
Nick Haley – violin
Tim Hodgkinson – Farfisa organ, Fender Rhodes electric piano, Vox organ
Steve Hillage – electric guitar
Simon Ingram Hill – cello, organ
Geoff Leigh (misspelt on the programme as "Jeff Leig") – flute

Ashley Mason – viola
Pierre Moerlen – cymbals, glockenspiel, gongs, tam-tam, tubular bells, timpani
Tom Newman – nasal chorus
Mike Oldfield – acoustic and electric guitars, bass, Lowrey organ, mandolin, "prehistoric poem"
Terry Oldfield – flute
Ted Speight – electric guitar
Vivian Stanshall – master of ceremonies
Mick Taylor – electric guitar
Janet Townley – violin
Vulpy – viola

Girlie Chorus: Sarah Greaves, Kathy Williams, Sally Oldfield, Maureen Rossini, Lynette Asquith, Amanda Parsons, Maggie Thomas, Mundy Ellis, Julie Clive, Liz Gluck, Debbie Scott, Hanna Corker.

BBC TV 2nd House, 1973 
Oldfield and many of the musicians who had taken part in the Queen Elizabeth Hall concert performed Part One again later in the year for the BBC arts programme 2nd House, this time as a pre-recorded performance in a studio setting without an audience. The performance was recorded on 30 November 1973 and transmitted on BBC2 on 5 January 1974. The arrangement included a new part for oboe, played by Soft Machine's Karl Jenkins, and accompanied on-screen visuals of tubular steel sculptures and sequences from the film Reflections, both created by artist William Pye. The performance was released on the Elements (2004) DVD and as part of the Deluxe and Ultimate Editions of the 2009 reissue of Tubular Bells.

Musicians:

Jon Field – flute
Fred Frith – bass, guitar
John Greaves – keyboards
Steve Hillage – guitar
Tim Hodgkinson – keyboards
Karl Jenkins – oboe
Geoff Leigh – flute
Pierre Moerlen (credited as "Pierre de Strasbourg" in the Radio Times programme listing) – percussion

Tom Newman – voice (nasal choir) and mixing
Mike Oldfield – bass, guitar, Hammond organ
Terry Oldfield – flute
Mike Ratledge – keyboards
Ted Speight – guitar, bass
Mick Taylor – guitar
Choir (unknown)

Reception 

Influential British DJ John Peel was an early admirer of the record, and played it on his Top Gear radio show on BBC Radio 1 on 29 May 1973, four days after the album's release, calling it "one of the most impressive LPs I've ever had the chance to play on the radio, really a remarkable record". Branson and Oldfield were listening to the show on Branson's houseboat, and Oldfield stated in his autobiography that Peel played the album in its entirety, although the running order from the BBC archives and existing audio copies of the programme show that Peel played Part One only.

Peel reviewed the album for The Listener magazine the following week, describing it as "a new recording of such strength and beauty that to me it represents the first break-through into history that any musician has made". The UK's major music magazines were also unanimous in their praise of the album. Al Clark of NME said that the "veritable orgy of over-dubbing results in a remarkable piece of sustained music, never content with the purely facile yet equally disinclined towards confusing the listener". He concluded that "Tubular Bells ... is a superlative record which owes nothing to contemporary whims. It is one of the most mature, vital, rich and humerous [sic] pieces of music to have emerged from the pop idiom." Melody Makers Geoff Brown observed that "Tubular Bells is a vast work, almost classical in its structure and in the way a theme is stated and deftly worked upon" and that it was "an enjoyable, evocative album which bodes well for the future of both the country's newest label and of Mike Oldfield". Reviewing the whole batch of Virgin's first album releases in Sounds, Steve Peacock named Tubular Bells the best, saying that after careful listening he "ended up convinced that it really is a remarkable album", noting the "complex, interlocking carefully woven music that works its way through an enormous dynamic and emotional range", and stating, "I can't think of another album that I'd as unhesitatingly recommend to everyone who's likely to read this". A more reserved review came from Simon Frith in Let It Rock who felt that Tubular Bells was "more than an attractive wall-paper, more than a nature-film score, because of Mike Oldfield's ability to make what happens to the music self-sufficient and satisfying", but questioned why Peel and other critics viewed the album as rock music, and concluded that "Oldfield's concern is the sound of rock, but Tubular Bells lacks rock's other essence — energy. This is no way body music — no sex, no violence, no ecstasy; nothing uncontrolled, nothing uncontrollable."

Paul Gambaccini wrote an enthusiastic review of the album for Rolling Stone, calling it "the most important one-shot project of 1973" and "a debut performance of a kind we have no right to expect from anyone. It took Mike Oldfield half a year to lay down the thousands of overdubs required for his 49 minutes of exhilarating music. I will be playing the result for many times that long." He concluded, "I can say that this is a major work". On the other hand, in an article in the same magazine seven months later which discussed the current top twenty albums on the Billboard chart, Jon Landau dismissed the record as "a clever novelty" and said, "Light, rather showy and cute in places, it probably makes pleasant background music for a dinner or conversation". Writing for Creem, Robert Christgau was also left unmoved, saying, "The best I can come up with here is 'pleasant' and 'catchy'. Oldfield isn't Richard Strauss or even Leonard Cohen — this is a soundtrack because that's the level at which he operates."

In a retrospective review for AllMusic Mike DeGagne called the album "arguably the finest conglomeration of off-centered instruments concerted together to form a single, unique piece" and stated that "the most interesting and overwhelming aspect of this album is the fact that so many sounds are conjured up, yet none go unnoticed, allowing the listener a gradual submergence into each unique portion of the music. Tubular Bells is a divine excursion into the realm of new-age music."

Accolades 
Oldfield won the 1974 Grammy Award for Best Instrumental Composition. The album was inducted into the Grammy Hall of Fame in 2018.

In Q magazine's 1998 list of "The 50 Best Albums of the '70s", Tubular Bells was placed at number six. In the Q & Mojo Classic special issue Pink Floyd & The Story of Prog Rock in 2005, the album was listed at number nine in its list of "40 Cosmic Rock Albums". The album was also included in the book 1001 Albums You Must Hear Before You Die.

Legacy

Use in The Exorcist 
The most important promotion for the record came from an unexpected source, when the introduction to Part One was chosen to feature in the film The Exorcist, which was released in the United States in December 1973 and in European cinemas in March 1974. According to British film critic Mark Kermode, the decision to include the music was the result of pure chance – director William Friedkin had decided to scrap the original score by Lalo Schifrin and was looking for music to replace it. Friedkin was visiting the offices of Ahmet Ertegun, president of Atlantic Records (which distributed Tubular Bells in the US), and picking up a white label of the album from the selection of records in Ertegun's office, he put it on the record player and instantly decided that the music would be perfect for the movie. Although the introduction only features briefly in two scenes in the movie, it has become the track most commonly associated with it. Oldfield has stated that he did not want to see the film because he believed he would find it too frightening.

Sequels and other albums 
Tubular Bells remains the album most identified with Oldfield, and he has released three sequels. Tubular Bells II was released in 1992 which, like its predecessor, reached number one in the UK. It was followed by the electronic and dance-oriented Tubular Bells III (1998) and The Millennium Bell (1999). On the thirtieth anniversary of Tubular Bells, Oldfield re-recorded the original Tubular Bells with contemporary technology, making several corrections to what he saw as flaws in the album's original production. Since Stanshall died in 1995, the re-recording features new narration provided by actor John Cleese. Tubular Bells 2003 went to number 51 in the UK.

In 1975, an orchestral arrangement of the original album was released as The Orchestral Tubular Bells.

Compilations:
 The Best of Tubular Bells (2001)
 The Complete Tubular Bells (2003)

Oldfield and York's 2013 remix album Tubular Beats contains two remixes of sections of Tubular Bells.

Virgin Group 

Richard Branson recognised the significance of Tubular Bells to the Virgin Group's success, who named one of his first Virgin America aircraft, an Airbus A319-112, N527VA Tubular Belle. Prior to this Virgin Atlantic had named a Boeing 747-4Q8, G-VHOT Tubular Belle, in 1994.

In the United Kingdom Virgin Money signalled its entry into the banking sector in January 2012 with a television advertisement titled '40 Years of Better'. The advertisement opened with an image of a record orbiting the earth accompanied by the music of the introduction to Tubular Bells, signifying the beginnings of Virgin, and ended with a shot of the same record framed and hanging on the wall of the new bank. Two months later a Virgin Media TV advertisement starring Branson and actor David Tennant also featured the record, where a younger version of Branson is seen holding a copy of Tubular Bells under his arm upon exiting a time machine. However, the advert was withdrawn shortly afterwards following objections from the BBC that it was being used to endorse a rival TV service (in the advert Tennant is shown searching on Virgin's TiVo on-demand service for episodes of Doctor Who, a BBC series in which he formerly played the titular character).

In May 2021, Virgin Orbit, the commercial rocket launch provider subsidiary of the Virgin Group, announced the first operational mission of their LauncherOne air-launched rocket would be named after the first track of the album, Tubular Bells, Part One.

Cultural references 
The use of the opening theme in the 1973 film The Exorcist gained the record considerable publicity and introduced the work to a broader audience. Along with a number of other Oldfield pieces the theme was used in the 1979 NASA movie The Space Movie. It has gained cultural significance as a "haunting theme", partly due to the association with The Exorcist, and has been sampled by many other artists.

In television it was used in several episodes of the Dutch children's series Bassie en Adriaan, an episode ("Ghosts") of the BBC series My Family. It was used in a television advertisement for the Volkswagen Golf Diesel in 2002 and in various films.

Computer tie-ins 
With the aid of the software house CRL and distributor Nu Wave, Mike Oldfield released an interactive Commodore 64 version of the album in 1986, which used the computer's SID sound chip to play back a simplified re-arrangement of the album, accompanied by some simple 2D visual effects. The "interactivity" offered by the album/program was limited to controlling the speed and quantity of the visual effects, tuning the sound's volume and filtering, and skipping to any part of the album.

In 2004, Oldfield launched a virtual reality project called Maestro which contains music from Tubular Bells 2003. The original title of the game was The Tube World. This was the second game which was released under the MusicVR banner, the first being Tres Lunas. MusicVR set out to be a real-time virtual reality experience combining imagery and music, as a non-violent and essentially a non-goal driven game.

In 2012 Universal and Indaba Music created a Tubular Bells remix contest, where users could download original stem recordings to create their own pieces and the winner of the $1,000 prize was judged by Oldfield.

2012 Olympic Games 
On 27 July 2012 at the 2012 Summer Olympics opening ceremony Mike Oldfield performed during a segment about the NHS and children’s literature. The show's director Danny Boyle stated that he had wanted to make Tubular Bells a "cornerstone" of a 20-minute sequence of the ceremony. A studio version of Oldfield's performance appears on the soundtrack album Isles of Wonder. Although listed as "Tubular Bells"/"In Dulci Jubilo", the track consists of a number of parts, the first being the introduction piece to his Tubular Bells in its normal arrangement, then this is followed by a rearranged version of that same theme that during interviews Oldfield has called "swingular bells". The piece that is used when children's literature villains appear features two arrangements of "Far Above the Clouds" (from Tubular Bells III), and finally as the Mary Poppins characters appear to drive off the villains, there is a rendition of "In Dulci Jubilo" followed by a short coda.

The Olympics version was released as a 500-copy limited edition pink/blue vinyl single on 8 October 2012. This was also released on iTunes as "Tubular Bells/In Dulci Julio (Music from the Opening Ceremony of the London 2012 Olympic Games)".

This lists the movements as:
 "Tubular Bells (Part One Excerpt)"
 "Tubular Bells (Part One Swing)"
 "Tubular Bells (Part Two Excerpt)"
 "Tubular Bells III (Far Above the Clouds)"
 "Mary Poppins Arrival"
 "Fanfare for the Isles of Wonder"
 "In Dulci Jubilo"
 "Olympic Tubular Bells Coda"

Adaptations 
American artist Tori Amos has frequently used the opening Tubular Bells theme in her live shows. It began during the 1996 Dew Drop Inn Tour where she let "Father Lucifer" segue into Tubular Bells on the piano while singing words from Bronski Beat's "Smalltown Boy" as well as playing it on the harpsichord during songs "Love Song" (a Cure cover) and "Bells for Her" (from the album Under the Pink), usually while mixing in lyrics from a third song such as Björk's "Hyperballad" or "Blue Skies". It appeared again in 2005 as part of "Yes, Anastasia", and on the 2007 tour promoting her album American Doll Posse where it was performed with full band as an intro to "Devils and Gods". On the 2011 tour, promoting her album Night of Hunters it is being performed as the intro to and backing melody for "God."

Tubular Bells for Two is a music-theatre production created by two Australian multi-instrumentalists, Aidan Roberts and Daniel Holdsworth, in 2009. The two musicians perform over twenty instruments to recreate the original album 'as faithfully as physically possible'. The show won a Sydney Fringe Award for Best Musical Moment in the 2010 Festival, and has been performed at festivals around Australia and the Pacific. The show made its European debut at the Edinburgh Festival Fringe in 2012, where it won two awards.

In 2013, Oldfield invited Branson to the opening of St. Andrew's International School of The Bahamas, where two of Oldfield's children were pupils. This was the occasion of the debut of Tubular Bells for Schools, a piano solo adaptation of Oldfield's work.

Track listing 
All music by Mike Oldfield, except on "Tubular Bells, Part Two" which includes "The Sailor's Hornpipe".

Side one
"Tubular Bells, Part One" – 26:01

Side two
"Tubular Bells, Part Two" – 23:17

Personnel 
Credits are adapted from album sleeve notes.

Mike Oldfield – grand piano, glockenspiel, Farfisa organ, bass guitar, electric guitar (including "speed guitar", "fuzz guitar", "mandolin-like guitar" and "guitars sounding like bagpipes"), taped motor drive amplifier organ chord, assorted percussion, acoustic guitar, flageolet, honky tonk piano, Lowrey organ, tubular bells, concert tympani, Hammond organ, Spanish guitar, vocals ("Piltdown Man" and "Moribund chorus")

Additional musicians
Steve Broughton – drums
Lindsay Cooper – string basses
Jon Field – flutes
Mundy Ellis – backing vocals ("Girlie Chorus")
Sally Oldfield – backing vocals ("Girlie Chorus")
Vivian Stanshall – Master of Ceremonies
Nasal Choir (uncredited)
Bootleg Chorus – the Manor Choir conducted by Mike Oldfield

Production
Mike Oldfield – producer, 2009 stereo and 5.1 surround sound mix
Simon Heyworth – producer, engineer, mastering
Tom Newman – producer, engineer
Trevor Key – artwork

Charts

Weekly charts

Year-end charts

Decade-end charts

Certifications and sales

References 
Notes

Citations

Sources

 
 

Further reading

External links 
 Mike Oldfield Discography – Tubular Bells at Tubular.net

1973 debut albums
Albums produced by Tom Newman (musician)
Instrumental albums
Mercury Records albums
Mike Oldfield albums
Mike Oldfield songs
The Exorcist
Virgin Records albums